Bill Smart (William Smart; born June 5, 1948 in Vancouver, British Columbia) is a retired male middle distance runner from Canada, who represented his native country at the 1972 Summer Olympics in Munich, West Germany. He claimed the silver medal in the men's 1500 metres event at the 1971 Pan American Games in Cali, Colombia and the bronze in the 800 metres at the 1970 British Commonwealth Games in Edinburgh.

References
 Profile at Sports-Reference.com

1948 births
Living people
Canadian male middle-distance runners
Olympic track and field athletes of Canada
Athletes (track and field) at the 1970 British Commonwealth Games
Athletes (track and field) at the 1971 Pan American Games
Athletes (track and field) at the 1972 Summer Olympics
Athletes (track and field) at the 1975 Pan American Games
Athletes from Vancouver
Pan American Games medalists in athletics (track and field)
Pan American Games silver medalists for Canada
Commonwealth Games medallists in athletics
Commonwealth Games bronze medallists for Canada
Medalists at the 1971 Pan American Games
Medallists at the 1970 British Commonwealth Games